Martin Poliačik (born June 27, 1980) 
is a politician and a member of the National Council of the Slovak Republic and a member of the "Progressive Slovakia" political party. He is one of the founding members of a classical liberal political party Freedom and Solidarity. In the National Council he is a member of Constitutional and Legal Affairs Committee and Committee on Education, Science, Youth and Sports.

Biography
He studied at University of Trnava between 1999 and 2006, where he earned Magister in philosophy and a supplementary degree in pedagogy.
He worked as an executive director of Slovak Debate Association between 2003 and 2005, and as a teacher at private school Montessori between 2009 and 2010.

Footnotes

1980 births
Living people
People from Považská Bystrica
Slovak educators
Members of the National Council (Slovakia) 2010-2012
Members of the National Council (Slovakia) 2012-2016
Members of the National Council (Slovakia) 2016-2020
Freedom and Solidarity politicians
Progressive Slovakia politicians
Montessori teachers